Cesta is a mountain near San Marino.

Cesta may also refer to:
Česta, a village in the municipality of Aleksinac, Serbia
Cesta, Ajdovščina, a settlement in the Vipava Valley, in the Littoral region of Slovenia
Cesta, Dobrepolje, a village in the Municipality of Dobrepolje in the historical region of Lower Carniola in Slovenia
Cesta, Kočevje, a former settlement in the Municipality of Kočevje in southern Slovenia
Cesta, Krško, a settlement in the hills above the Sava River in the Municipality of Krško in eastern Slovenia
Cesta, Trebnje, a small settlement west of Veliki Gaber in the Municipality of Trebnje in eastern Slovenia
CEA Cesta or 
Cesta (sports), equipment for the game of jai alai